Phil Schofer (born 22 April 1948) is a New Zealand cricketer. He played in two first-class matches for Wellington in 1983/84.

See also
 List of Wellington representative cricketers

References

External links
 

1948 births
Living people
New Zealand cricketers
Wellington cricketers
Cricketers from Lower Hutt